Smalto may refer to:
 a piece of glass used in a mosaic
 Francesco Smalto, Italian fashion designer.
 Smalto, an album by Nada